Brenden Russell Aaronson (born October 22, 2000) is an American professional soccer player who plays as an attacking midfielder or winger for Premier League club Leeds United and the United States national team.

In May 2022, Aaronson moved to Leeds from Red Bull Salzburg in a transfer worth $30.2 million (£24.7 million), making him the second most expensive American soccer player of all time.

Early life
Raised in Medford, New Jersey, Aaronson attended Shawnee High School for a single year before being selected to the Philadelphia Union's YSC Academy, where he played soccer and completed his high school education. During his time at YSC Academy, Aaronson had played for Union's youth teams before committing to Indiana University and signing an amateur contract with Bethlehem Steel FC.

Club career

Bethlehem Steel
Aaronson appeared as an academy player playing for Bethlehem Steel FC during their 2017 season after coming through the Philadelphia Union academy.
In October 2017, Aaronson made his first start for Steel FC in an away draw versus Tampa Bay Rowdies. Aaronson made 21 appearances for Steel FC and scored his first goal for the professional side against Atlanta United 2.

Philadelphia Union
On September 17, 2018, it was announced that Aaronson would join the Philadelphia Union at the beginning of their 2019 season. On March 17, 2019, the homegrown player scored his first professional goal in his MLS debut, helping Philadelphia tie against Atlanta United. Considered to be a back-up playmaker for the Union, injuries and suspensions gave Aaronson the opportunity to start and excel in the first team as both playmaking number 10 and left-sided box-to-box midfielder.

At the end of his rookie season, Aaronson finished second for 2019 MLS Rookie of the year, with three goals and two assists in over 1,640 minutes played. Aaronson was the youngest player out of the five finalists.

The 2020 season became a breakout year for Aaronson who finished the season with 31 appearances across all competitions and scoring 4 goals. Aaronson's performance during the season earned him several accolades include being named to the 2020 MLS Best XI for the regular season and the MLS is Back Tournament. The Union finished the season with the best league record earning the team's first trophy, the 2020 Supporters' Shield.

Red Bull Salzburg 
After persistent rumors, it was announced on October 16, 2020, that Aaronson would join Red Bull Salzburg effective January 2021 after the MLS season ended. While the transfer fee was undisclosed, Philadelphia announced that it would be the highest transfer fee paid for an American homegrown player from MLS. Early news reports indicated the fee is US$6 million up front, with US$3 million in possible incentives. Aaronson made his debut for Salzburg on January 25, as a substitute during a 2–0 victory over Rheindorf Altach.

Aaronson scored his first goal for Salzburg on February 10, 2021, scoring the game-winning goal during an eventual 3–1 win over Austria Wien. On May 1, he won his first piece of silverware with Salzburg as the club defeated LASK in the Austrian Cup final by 3–0. Aaronson scored the second goal of the match, and his fifth in all competitions since his move from Philadelphia in January.

Leeds United
On May 26, 2022, Leeds United announced the signing of Aaronson on a five-year contract, beginning on July 1. Sky Sports reported the transfer fee to be £24.7 million. He made his senior league debut for Leeds as part of the starting eleven in their season opener on August 6, with a 2–1 home win over Wolverhampton Wanderers. On August 21, Aaronson scored his first Premier League goal after forcing an error from Chelsea goalkeeper Édouard Mendy in a 3–0 home win over rivals Chelsea, helping Leeds secure their first victory over the Blues for 20 years.

International career 
After showing a strong rookie season, Aaronson received his first senior call-up to the United States men's national soccer team in October 2019 for CONCACAF Nations League matches with Cuba and Canada. He did not earn a cap in either match. Aaronson earned his second call-up to the senior team for the 2020 January camp. Aaronson earned his full debut in a 1–0 win over Costa Rica. Later that year, Aaronson scored his first senior international goal during a 6–0 victory over El Salvador in December 2020.

Aaronson was included in the 26-man squad for the 2022 FIFA World Cup, playing in all three group games.

Personal life 
His brother Paxten Aaronson plays for Eintracht Frankfurt.

Aaronson's performances for the Philadelphia Union and Red Bull Salzburg earned him the nickname of the “Medford Messi”, an alliteration that refers to his birthplace and makes a comparison with Argentine player Lionel Messi.

Career statistics

Club

International

As of match played June 1, 2022. United States score listed first, score column indicates score after each Aaronson goal.

Honors 
Philadelphia Union
Supporters' Shield: 2020

Red Bull Salzburg
Austrian Bundesliga: 2020–21, 2021–22
Austrian Cup: 2020–21, 2021–22

United States
CONCACAF Nations League: 2019–20

Individual
MLS is Back Tournament Best XI: 2020
MLS Best XI: 2020

References

External links 
 
Brenden Aaronson at Philadelphia Union
Brenden Aaronson at Major League Soccer
Brenden Aaronson at US Soccer

2000 births
Living people
American men's soccer players
Homegrown Players (MLS)
Philadelphia Union II players
Philadelphia Union players
FC Red Bull Salzburg players
Leeds United F.C. players
Association football midfielders
People from Medford, New Jersey
Shawnee High School (New Jersey) alumni
Soccer players from New Jersey
Sportspeople from Burlington County, New Jersey
USL Championship players
Major League Soccer players
Premier League players
United States men's international soccer players
2022 FIFA World Cup players
American expatriate soccer players
Expatriate footballers in Austria
American expatriate sportspeople in Austria
Expatriate footballers in England
American expatriate sportspeople in England
United States men's under-23 international soccer players